Saghar District is situated in the most southwestern part of Ghor province, Afghanistan with district center Titan. The population is 33,700 people. The district, as the other mountainous districts in the province, suffers long and severe winters and continuing drought during the summer.

Economy 
The district suffers from poverty and weak economy due to spread of diseases, low agriculture and livestock productions and poor access to basic infrastructural, social, economical and educational services.
 Agriculture products include wheat, barley, maize and potato.

References

External links 
 Map of Settlements IMMAP, September 2011
 Takhtasoo Village Road Project Photo MRRD/NSP, May 2010

Districts of Ghor Province